Alexisz Novák (born 22 November 1987) is a Hungarian professional footballer who plays for BFC Siófok and was born in Budapest.

Club statistics

Updated to games played as of 9 March 2014.

External links
 Profile at HLSZ

1987 births
Living people
Footballers from Budapest
Hungarian footballers
Association football defenders
MTK Budapest FC players
BKV Előre SC footballers
FC Felcsút players
Budaörsi SC footballers
Budapest Honvéd FC players
BFC Siófok players
Nemzeti Bajnokság I players